Hopkins High School may refer to:

 Hopkins High School,  Minnetonka, Minnesota
 Hopkins High School (Michigan), Hopkins, Michigan
 North Hopkins High School, Birthright, Texas
 Hopkins West Junior High School, Minnetonka, Minnesota
 Madisonville North Hopkins High School, Madisonville, Kentucky

See also
 Hopkins School
 Hopkins Public Schools (disambiguation)